The Fu Yang Festival is a traditional festival celebrated by local residents in Xuzhou, an ancient city located in the northwest of Jiangsu province. The festival starts on the day of Chufu which is around mid-July  according  to  the  lunar calendar (about 27 days after the summer solstice) and lasts for nearly one month. 
In China, “Fu” refers to the hottest days in summer. As is known to us all, mutton (including goat, sheep, lamb) is a kind of hot food which may make people sweat when they are eating——that's why in most parts of China people choose to eat mutton in cold winter day rather than in summer. However, in Xuzhou, people act in a diametrically opposite way, they enjoy being bathed in sweat as well as tasting the delicious dishes made from mutton under the burning hot sun.

However, little is known that eating mutton cooked with pepper, chili, cumin or other hot condiments during summer days is of great benefit to people's health according to Chinese traditional medicine in that it can save your body  from the cold and prepare you well for the northern chilly weather when autumn and winter come along. This folk custom has been in existence for thousands of years and has significantly contributed to the local culture, making it more abundant, colorful and meaningful.
During the one-month festival, all restaurants in Xuzhou  recommend  their best dishes to  the diners, hoping to satisfy them and do good business. Other restaurants in the surrounding  areas  who  own  flavor characteristics are warmly welcomed  to come  to the city center and demonstrate their  regional  food. For example, there are traditional opera, martial arts, the Chinese Kung fu, goat-fight, paper-cut, Shadow Play Puppet, and  numbers of flower or stone or bird shows.
In Fu Yang Festival, people gather for celebration. They eat mutton and drink mutton soup. This festival is very popular among all the citizens and has greatly enhanced the attractive power of Xuzhou.

References

External sources 

Festivals in China
Tourist attractions in Jiangsu
Summer events in China